The Yenepoya School is a school situated in Mangalore city of Karnataka in India. It is affiliated to the Central Board of Secondary Education (CBSE). A Centre of Excellence (CoE) for Robotics and Automation is present in this school.

Facilities and Amenities 
Some of the facilities offered by this school are as follows
 Physics Lab
 Chemistry Lab
 Biology Lab
 Swimming pool
 Gym
 Skateboarding ramp
 Bowling machine
 Music classes
 Dance classes
 Arts/craft classes
 Theatre classes

References

External link

Schools in Mangalore
Schools in Dakshina Kannada district
High schools and secondary schools in Karnataka
Educational institutions established in 2012